Finland competed at the 2022 Winter Paralympics in Beijing, China which took place between 4–13 March 2022.

Medalists

The following Finnish competitors won medals at the games. In the discipline sections below, the medalists' names are bolded.

| width="56%" align="left" valign="top" |

| width="22%" align="left" valign="top" |

Competitors
The following is the list of number of competitors participating at the Games per sport/discipline.

Alpine skiing

Santeri Kiiveri and Maiju Laurila competed in alpine skiing.

Cross-country skiing

Inkki Inola competed in cross-country skiing.

Men's distance

Sprint

Snowboarding

Three snowboarders represented Finland.

Banked slalom

Snowboard cross

Qualification legend: Q - Qualify to next round; FA - Qualify to medal final; FB - Qualify to consolation final

See also
Finland at the Paralympics
Finland at the 2022 Winter Olympics

References

Nations at the 2022 Winter Paralympics
2022
Winter Paralympics